The 1990 Toray Pan Pacific Open was a women's tennis tournament played on indoor carpet courts at the Yoyogi National Gymnasium in Tokyo, Japan that was part of the Tier II Series of the 1990 WTA Tour. It was the seventh edition of the Pan Pacific Open and took place from 29 January through 4 February 1990. First-seeded Steffi Graf won the singles title and earned $70,000 first-prize money as well as 300 ranking points.

Finals

Singles

 Steffi Graf defeated  Arantxa Sánchez Vicario 6–1, 6–2
 It was Graf's 2nd singles title of the year and the 46th of her career.

Doubles

 Gigi Fernández /  Elizabeth Smylie  defeated  Jo-Anne Faull /  Rachel McQuillan 6–2, 6–2

References

External links
 ITF tournament edition details
 Tournament draws